Josip Ćorić (born 9 November 1988)  is a Bosnian footballer who plays for Dinamo Odranski Obrež.

Club career
He came to Spartak Trnava in summer 2010.

Personal life
Josip is the older brother of Ante Ćorić.

References

External links
 Austrian career stats - ÖFB

1988 births
Living people
Footballers from Zagreb
Association football midfielders
Bosnia and Herzegovina footballers
Bosnia and Herzegovina under-21 international footballers
NK Rudeš players
NK Moslavina players
FC Slovan Liberec players
FC Spartak Trnava players
FC DAC 1904 Dunajská Streda players
FC Liefering players
NK Istra 1961 players
NK Sesvete players
GNK Dinamo Zagreb players
NK Lokomotiva Zagreb players
NK Široki Brijeg players
NK Hrvatski Dragovoljac players
NK Lučko players
Second Football League (Croatia) players
First Football League (Croatia) players
Czech First League players
Slovak Super Liga players
Austrian Regionalliga players
Croatian Football League players
Premier League of Bosnia and Herzegovina players
Bosnia and Herzegovina expatriate footballers
Expatriate footballers in Slovakia
Bosnia and Herzegovina expatriate sportspeople in Slovakia
Expatriate footballers in Austria
Bosnia and Herzegovina expatriate sportspeople in Austria
Expatriate footballers in Croatia
Bosnia and Herzegovina expatriate sportspeople in Croatia
Expatriate footballers in the Czech Republic
Bosnia and Herzegovina expatriate sportspeople in the Czech Republic